The Play-offs of the 2007 Fed Cup Americas Zone Group I were the final stages of the Group I Zonal Competition involving teams from the Americas. Using the positions determined in their pools, the seven teams faced off to determine their placing in the 2007 Fed Cup Americas Zone Group I. The team that ended up placing first overall advanced to World Group II play-offs, whilst those coming in sixth and seventh were relegated down to Group II for the next year.

Promotional play-offs
The top team of each pool was placed against each other in a head-to-head round. The winner of the round advanced to World Group II for next year.

Brazil vs. Argentina

Third to Fourth play-off
The second placed teams of each pool were placed against each other in a ties. The winner of the tie was allocated third place in the Group while the loser was allocated fourth.

Mexico vs. Colombia

Relegation play-offs
Because there was one extra player in Pool B, the last-placed team of that pool, Dominican Republic was automatically relegated down to Group II. The third-placed teams of each pool were then placed against each other in a tie, where the losing team would join the Dominicans in relegation.

Chile vs. Puerto Rico

Final placements

 Argentina advanced to the World Group II play-offs, and were drawn against Canada, where they won 3–1. The team thus advanced to World Group II for the next year.
 Chile and the Dominican Republic were relegated down to Americas Zone Group II for the next year. The Chileans placed equal third, while the Dominicans placed equal seventh.

See also
Fed Cup structure

References

External links
 Fed Cup website

2007 Fed Cup Americas Zone